Constitutional Assembly elections were held in Argentina on 10 April 1994. Justicialist Party won the most seats, but failed to win a majority. The Constitutional Assembly amended the Constitution later that year.

Results

Results by province

References

1994 elections in Argentina
Elections in Argentina